Sayyid Ebrahim Amini is an Iranian reformist politician who is member and vice chairman of City Council of Tehran.

Biography
Amini served as a member of parliament from 2000 to 2004.

He was a senior campaigner for Mehdi Karroubi's presidential campaign in the 2005 Iranian presidential election.

References

1959 births
Living people
Members of the 6th Islamic Consultative Assembly
National Trust Party (Iran) politicians
Tehran Councillors 2017–
Vice Chairmen of City Council of Tehran
Islamic Iran Participation Front politicians